Ribarska Banja is a village and spa located in the municipality of Kruševac, Serbia. As of the 2011 census, it has a population of 189 inhabitants.

See also
 List of spa towns in Serbia

References

External links

Populated places in Rasina District